Nikkita Kalea "Kita" Alexander (born 25 February 1996) is an Australian pop singer-songwriter from Brisbane, Queensland, known for her 'short and evocative lines demonstrating Taylor Swift-level lyrical prowess.' 

Her single "Hotel", peaked at number 51 on the ARIA Singles Chart in November 2017 and was certified 2× Platinum by Australian Recording Industry Association (ARIA) in 2020.

Early life
Nikkita Kalea Alexander was born on 25 February 1996 in Brisbane, Queensland.

She was raised in Port Macquarie, where she began performing at the age of 15, and left high school to focus on her music career.

Personal life
Kita Alexander's elder sister, Natassja Alexander, died in July 2013. She dedicated her 2017 Hotel EP to her sister's memory, saying: "It's heavily influenced and deeply personal. "Hotel" is about dealing with the loss."

She married Australian professional surfer Owen Wright in 2019.
Close friend and fellow musician Jack River was a member of the bridal party, alongside Lisa Mitchell and Isabel Lucas.

Alexander and Wright's first child, Vali, was born in 2016. Their second child, Rumi Alexander Wright, was born on 15 January 2021.

Career

2013-2014: Lion Hat
Her first extended play, Lion Hat, with six tracks, was issued in March 2013. It was produced by Jordan Millar and recorded in Sydney. Lisa Tisdell of Port Macquarie News felt, "the finished product containing songs that appeal to a cross-section of people." She moved to Byron Bay, after turning 18.

Alexander found her talent manager, Tim Manton (of After the Fall) of TAP Management, via a Google search.

2015–2016: Like You Want to

Alexander released her debut single "My Own Way" in August 2015. "My Own Way" received airplay on national youth radio station Triple J, and peaked at #95 on the ARIA Singles Chart. AllMusic's Neil Z. Yeung observed that, "[her influences] informed much of her sonic aesthetic, while polished production sheen enhanced her pop sensibilities." Alexander had travelled to the west coast of United States earlier that year to record an acoustic music video for "My Own Way" at Noisey Acoustics in Topanga Canyon. "My Own Way" polled at #125 in Triple J's Hottest 200 of 2015.

The singer's second EP, Like You Want to was released in November 2015. The EP was rated by AllMusic's Neil Yeung at three-and-a-half stars out-of five, which he described as, "a fun and carefree quartet of atmospheric pop... a promising start for the young singer, whose sunburned throwback pop displays a maturity well beyond her years." The title single was issued earlier in that month, which peaked at #82 on the ARIA Singles Chart. "Like You Want To" ranked at #107 in Triple J's Hottest 200 of 2015  and was then certified Gold by ARIA in 2020.

2017–2018: Hotel

Alexander's third EP, Hotel, was released in April 2017. The title single peaked in the top 60 on the ARIA Singles Chart in November after charting in the related ARIA Hitseekers Singles Chart for over 20 weeks. It was certified platinum, for shipment of 70,000 units, by Australian Recording Industry Association (ARIA) in February 2018 and 2× platinum in 2020.

"Hotel" came in at #196 in Triple J's Hottest 200 of 2017.

2019–2021: "Between You & I" and "Against the Water"

In May 2019, Alexander released "Between You & I", which samples Tears for Fears' 1985 song Everybody Wants to Rule the World. "Between You & I" polled at #179 in Triple J's Hottest 200 of 2019  and was certified Gold in 2020.

In February 2020, Alexander released "Against the Water". The song references her partner Owen Wright's brain injury (which occurred while surfing competitively Pipeline on the North Shore of Hawaii) and Alexander's subsequent withdrawal from touring in order to nurse him back to health.

2022: The One
On 11 March 2022, Alexander released "Run" in which she disavows an unhealthy relationship and sings of finding the courage to break free and is the first taste of a forthcoming EP, due in 2022.

On 19 August 2022, Alexander released "Ocean Blue".

On 4 November 2022, Alexander released "Memories of You", the fourth single from her fourth EP, The One, scheduled for related on 17 November 2022. "Memories of You" reckons with trauma of sexual abuse to which Alexander says, "I hope that the men who listen to this song will digest it's true meaning and have it in the back of their heads, on repeat, always".

Discography

Extended plays

Singles

References

External links
 

1996 births
21st-century Australian women singers
Australian women pop singers
Australian indie pop musicians
Living people